Jeff Mitchell is the name of:
Jeff Mitchell (born 1974), American professional football player
Jeff Mitchell (golfer) (born 1954), American professional golfer and college golf coach
Jeff Mitchell (ice hockey) (born 1975), NHL hockey player
Jeffrey Mitchell (actor) in Naked Amazon
Geoff Mitchell in 1991 CFL Draft
Geoffrey Mitchell (conductor) and chorister